The Bukovina Museum is a museum located in the Romanian city of Suceava, named after the historical Bukovina region.

The Bukovina Museum consists of several individual museums, objects and memorial houses scattered throughout the region. They pursue their own programs and series of events, but are managed together. The headquarters is located in the History Museum (Muzeul de Istorie din Suceava), in the center of the city of Suceava. The History Museum is the oldest part of the Bukovina Museum and essentially the nucleus around which the complex with its various facilities was built. The History Museum was built in 1898 and is now a cultural heritage site. The Museum's collection includes photographs by German photographer Oliver Mark.

References

External links 

 Official website

Bukovina
Suceava
Museums in Romania
History museums
Historic monuments in Suceava County
1900 establishments